Tanimbar Islands Regency is a regency of Maluku province, Indonesia, consisting primarily of the Tanimbar Islands. The Regency covers a land area of 10,102 km2, and it had a population of 105,341 at the 2010 Census and 123,572 at the 2020 Census. The principal town and administrative centre lies at Saumlaki.

History 

Administration 
As at 2010 the regency was divided into nine districts (kecamatan), tabulated below with their areas in km2 and their 2010 Census populations: Subsequently, a tenth district - Molu Maru (consisting of the two northernmost islands in the Tanimbars - Molu and Maru - with a combined land area of 63.8 km2) - was by 2017 created from part of the existing Wuorlabobar District. The districts' populations at the 2020 Census are also shown. The table also includes the locations of the district administrative centres, the number of villages (rural desa and urban kelurahan) in each district, and its postal code. Altogether the archipelago contains 99 islands.

Note: (a) Yaru District changed its name to Fordata District in 2019. (b) the area and 2010 population of Molu Maru district are included in the figures for Wuarlabobar district, from which it was split off.

References

External links

Regencies of Maluku (province)